"Lotta Svärd" –  means a sword – is the fourth poem in the second part of Johan Ludvig Runeberg's epic poem The Tales of Ensign Stål from 1860.

The "Lotta Svärd" poem is about a woman who manned a field kitchen during the Finnish War. The name was later used for several Lotta movements (women's auxiliary movements) in the Nordic countries (Finland, Sweden, Denmark and Norway).

See also
The poem Lotta Svärd in Wikisource
Lotta Svärd – Finnish voluntary auxiliary paramilitary organisation for women.
Swedish Women's Voluntary Defence Organization ("Lottorna")

References

1860 poems
Finnish War